Abdiel Arroyo Molinar (born 13 December 1993) is a Panamanian international footballer who plays for Universidad César Vallejo. Arroyo also represents the Panama national football team.

Club career
In summer 2015, Arroyo caught the eye of Honduran side Marathón and Peruvian outfit César Vallejo after a good showing at the Gold Cup.

Arroyo scored his first goal for Newcastle Jets in a 5-1 Win V Edgeworth in the FFA CUP, He then scored his 2nd for the jets against Adelaide United in the Hyundai A-League

International career
A speedy striker, Arroyo made his debut for Panama in an August 2014 friendly match against Peru and has as of 14 June 2016, earned a total of 17 caps, scoring one goal.

He was called up to the Panama team for the 2015 CONCACAF Gold Cup; he played in Panama's opening game.

In May 2018, he was named in Panama's 23-man squad for the 2018 FIFA World Cup in Russia.

Career statistics

International

International goals
Scores and results list Panama's goal tally first.

|-
| 1. || 14 June 2016 || Lincoln Financial Field, Philadelphia, United States ||  || align=center | 2–3 || align=center | 2–4 || Copa América Centenario
|-
| 2. || 2 September 2016 || rowspan=2 | Estadio Rommel Fernández, Panama City, Panama ||  || align=center | 2–0 || align=center | 2–0 || 2018 FIFA World Cup qualification
|-
| 3. || 20 January 2017  ||  || align=center | 1–0 || align=center | 1–0 || 2017 Copa Centroamericana
|-
| 4. || 15 July 2017 || FirstEnergy Stadium, Cleveland, United States ||  || align=center | 2–0 || align=center | 3–0 || 2017 CONCACAF Gold Cup
|-
| 5. || 5 September 2017 || Estadio Rommel Fernández, Panama City, Panama ||  || align=center | 3–0 || align=center | 3–0 || 2018 FIFA World Cup qualification
|-
| 6. || 16 October 2018 || Cheonan Stadium, Cheonan, South Korea ||  || align=center | 1–2 || align=center | 2–2 || Friendly
|-
| 7. || 22 June 2019 || FirstEnergy Stadium, Cleveland, United States ||  || align=center | 1–0 || align=center | 4–2 || 2019 CONCACAF Gold Cup
|}

References

External links

1993 births
Living people
Association football forwards
Panamanian footballers
Deportes Tolima footballers
Panama international footballers
C.D. Árabe Unido players
RNK Split players
Danubio F.C. players
L.D. Alajuelense footballers
C.D. Santa Clara players
Newcastle Jets FC players
Maccabi Petah Tikva F.C. players
Liga Panameña de Fútbol players
Categoría Primera A players
Liga FPD players
Primeira Liga players
Israeli Premier League players
Sportspeople from Colón, Panama
2015 CONCACAF Gold Cup players
Copa América Centenario players
2017 Copa Centroamericana players
2017 CONCACAF Gold Cup players
2018 FIFA World Cup players
2019 CONCACAF Gold Cup players
Panamanian expatriate footballers
Uruguayan Primera División players
Expatriate footballers in Colombia
Expatriate footballers in Uruguay
Expatriate footballers in Costa Rica
Expatriate footballers in Portugal
Expatriate soccer players in Australia
Expatriate footballers in Israel
Panamanian expatriate sportspeople in Colombia
Panamanian expatriate sportspeople in Uruguay
Panamanian expatriate sportspeople in Costa Rica
Panamanian expatriate sportspeople in Portugal
Panamanian expatriate sportspeople in Australia
Panamanian expatriate sportspeople in Israel